Tanzania Business Times is a weekly Tanzanian newspaper published in Dar es Salaam, the business capital and largest city in the second-largest economy in the  East African Community. It is the only exclusively business weekly published in the country.

Overview
The newspaper covers investment and business news in Tanzania. It is published in English only. It has a print version, but is also available on the Internet.

History
The paper is published by Business Times Limited, a company founded in 1988, which publishes three other papers: (a) Majira, a daily news publication in Kiswahili (b) Dar Leo, another news daily, also in Kiswahili and (c) Spoti Starehe, a weekly sports newspaper in Kiswahili.

See also
 List of newspapers in Tanzania
 Media in Tanzania

References

External links
 Website of Tanzania Business Times

Dar es Salaam
Newspapers published in Tanzania
Newspapers established in 1988
1988 establishments in Tanzania
Weekly newspapers
Mass media in Dar es Salaam